Filip Dragóner (born 12 March 1998) is a Hungarian professional footballer who plays for Ajka.

Club career
On 13 August 2021, Dragóner signed a two-year contract with Ajka.

Club statistics

Updated to games played as of 27 June 2020.

References

External links

1998 births
Footballers from Budapest
Living people
Hungarian footballers
Hungary youth international footballers
Association football forwards
Nyíregyháza Spartacus FC players
Mezőkövesdi SE footballers
Szeged-Csanád Grosics Akadémia footballers
Zalaegerszegi TE players
Szombathelyi Haladás footballers
FC Ajka players
Nemzeti Bajnokság I players
Nemzeti Bajnokság II players